Bangalaia camerunica is a species of beetle in the family Cerambycidae. It was described by Stephan von Breuning in 1974. It is known from Cameroon.

References

Endemic fauna of Cameroon
Prosopocerini
Beetles described in 1974